Tydeus is a genus of mites belonging to the family Tydeidae. These are small, usually white, mites with soft bodies covered in striations and each leg terminating in two claws.

Description 
Tydeus, like most mites, have a pair of chelicerae, a pair of palps and four pairs of legs. Each palp has an unmodified palptarsus lacking markedly elongated setae, and a palptibia lacking claw-like setae. The chelicerae are contiguous with each other and have stylet-like movable digits. Bothridial setae are present on the prodorsum of the body. The ovipore is longitudinal. The tarsi of the first leg pair end in claws.

The patterns of setae on the legs help to separate Tydeus from other genera in the family. The genu of the first leg pair has three setae while the genu of the second leg pair has two setae, and those of the third and fourth leg pairs have one seta each. Additionally, the femur of the first leg pair has three setae.

Ecology 
Mites in this genus occur in various habitats including plant leaves, moss, nests of vertebrate animals, barn debris and stored products. They are omnivorous scavengers that also prey on small arthropods and eggs of arthropods. For example, Tydeus caudatus both preys on eriophyid mites and feeds on downy mildew.

Tydeus are themselves preyed on by phytoseiid mites.

Some species occur in nests of bees, which they probably enter by walking. They have been found in nests of Western honey bee (Apis mellifera), bumble bees (Bombus) and carpenter bees (Xylocopa). They are not considered harmful to bees.

Selected species

Tydeus argutus
Tydeus bohemiensis
Tydeus brevistylus
Tydeus calabrus
Tydeus californicus
Tydeus caudatus
Tydeus citri
Tydeus commutabilis
Tydeus demeyerei
Tydeus dignus
Tydeus diversus
Tydeus domesticus
Tydeus electus
Tydeus eriophyes
Tydeus goetzi
Tydeus grabouwi
Tydeus halophilus
Tydeus heterosetus
Tydeus hughesae
Tydeus hyacinthi
Tydeus inclutus
Tydeus interruptus
Tydeus kochi
Tydeus lambi
Tydeus langei
Tydeus linarocatus
Tydeus lindquisti
Tydeus lolitae
Tydeus longisetosus
Tydeus maculatus
Tydeus marinus
Tydeus maximus
Tydeus munsteri
Tydeus mutabilis
Tydeus octomaculatus
Tydeus olivaceus
Tydeus plumosus
Tydeus praeditus
Tydeus quadrisetosus
Tydeus rafalskii
Tydeus roseus
Tydeus sampsoni
Tydeus sarekensis
Tydeus spathulatus
Tydeus subalpinus
Tydeus subterraneus
Tydeus svalbardensis
Tydeus tiliae
Tydeus totensis
Tydeus viviparus
Tydeus xylocopae

References

External links 
New species of mites of the families Tydeidae and Labidostommidae (Acarina: Prostigmata) collected from South African plants

Trombidiformes